P